Lauralee Kristen Bell (born December 22, 1968) is an American soap opera actress. She was born in Chicago, Illinois, and attended The Latin School of Chicago.

The only daughter of soap opera creators William J. Bell and Lee Phillip Bell, and sister to Bill Bell, Jr. and Bradley Bell as well as sister-in-law to Maria Arena Bell and Colleen Bell, Lauralee was offered a bit role as a model, Christine "Cricket" Blair, on her parents' show The Young and the Restless in 1983 and that became a contract role in 1986.

Over time, her character matured from a model into a legal aid lawyer. Her character also dropped the childish moniker "Cricket", especially after her rival Phyllis (Michelle Stafford) turned it into a pun against her, calling her "the Bug." In January 2005, Bell asked to be released from her contract, and she appears only on a recurring basis.

Lauralee married photographer Scott Martin on October 4, 1997. They have a son, Christian James Martin, born on January 17, 2001, and a daughter, Samantha Lee Martin, born on October 28, 2002.  In June 2007, she reprised her role of Christine Blair for a short run on The Bold and the Beautiful. In July 2010, she returned to The Young and the Restless in a recurring capacity. Lauralee co-owned a boutique, On Sunset, which closed in 2009.  In 2021, Bell played Daphne Dumas in the Lifetime TV miniseries "Ruby Landry."

Roles

Film

Television

Awards
Daytime Emmy Award Winner, Outstanding Special Class Short Format Daytime (for producing the web series mI promise) (2013)
Soap Opera Award Winner, Outstanding Supporting Actress (1999)
Soap Opera Award Nominee, Outstanding Younger Lead Actress (1997)
TEEN Magazine, Favorite Soap Opera Actress (1989)

References

External links

1968 births
Living people
American soap opera actresses
American television actresses
Actresses from Chicago
Latin School of Chicago alumni
21st-century American women